Samuel Harrison Carter (born 6 August 1991) is a Paralympic athlete, who competes in 100m, 200m, 400m T54 events. He has represented Australia at the 2016 Rio Paralympics and 2020 Tokyo Paralympics.

Personal
Carter was born on 6 August 1991, He attended Harristown State High School in Queensland.
Before becoming a wheelchair racer, He was actively engaged in sport in particular swimming and wheelchair basketball. He then attended a sports day held by Queensland Sporting Wheelies in 2001 aimed at increasing the participation of disabled kids in sport. At the event Carter met Paralympian Geoff Trappett who won gold in the Men's T54 100m at the 2000 Sydney Paralympic Games and encouraged Carter to become involved in wheelchair racing. Carter has been an ethical vegan since 2017.   He currently resides in Canberra, Australia.

Sporting career
Carter began competing in 2003 as a junior athlete. Throughout his career, Carter has trained under a number of coaches including Geoff Darragh, Glen Baker, Brett Jones, Paul Angel, and currently trains under Fred Periac at the Australian Institute of Sport in Canberra. In 2008 he broke national age records for the 100m, 200m and 400m in wheelchair racing. He went on to become the 100m junior world champion, winning gold in the 100m at the 2009 Junior Athletics World Championships. In 2011 Carter made the transition into adult competitions where, he has competed against wheelchair racers such as David Weir and Marcel Hug.
Carter represented Australia at the 2011 IPC Athletics World Championships in Christchurch in the T54 100m, 200m and 400m.
He also competed in the 2011 Gold Coast Wheelchair Half Marathon which he won.
In 2013 Carter was selected to represent Australia, in the T54 100m, 200m and 400m at the 2013 IPC Athletics World Championships in Lyon.] He placed 6th and 5th in the T54 100m and 200m respectively.
He won gold and silver at the 2015 Brisbane IPC Grand Prix in the T54 100m and 400m respectively.

At the 2015 IPC Athletics World Championships in Doha, Carter finished sixth in the Men's 100 m T54, fifth in the Men's 200 m and sixteenth in the Men's 400 m T54.

At the 2016 Rio Paralympics, Carter finished sixth in the Men's 100 m T54 and was ranked 15th in the Men's 400 m T54.

At the 2019 World Para Athletics Championships in London, Carter finished fourth both the Men's 100 m T54 and Men's 400 m T54.

At the 2020 Tokyo Paralympics, Carter finished seventh in the heat and therefore qualified for the final. He came fifth in the Men's 100 m T54 final and failed to win a medal. In the Men's 400 m T54 Carter came ninth and did not advance to the final.

At the 2022 Commonwealth Games, Birmingham, he won the bronze medal in the Men's 1500 m T54.

He is coached by Fred Periac.

Recognition
In 2009 Carter won the Sports Darling Downs senior rookie of the year.

References

External links
 
 
 Sam Carter at Australian Athletics Historical Results

Wheelchair category Paralympic competitors
Paralympic athletes of Australia
Athletes (track and field) at the 2016 Summer Paralympics
Athletes (track and field) at the 2020 Summer Paralympics
Sportsmen from Queensland
People with spina bifida
1991 births
Living people
20th-century Australian people
21st-century Australian people
Commonwealth Games bronze medallists for Australia
Commonwealth Games medallists in athletics
Athletes (track and field) at the 2022 Commonwealth Games
Medallists at the 2022 Commonwealth Games